Cabrini Shrine may refer to:

Mother Cabrini Shrine in Golden, Colorado
St. Frances Xavier Cabrini Shrine in Manhattan, New York City